Live 89.5 Radio is an English language radio station that broadcasts in Phuket and the surrounding areas. Owing to its affiliation with The Phuket News weekly newspaper, it is the only Phuket station that produces its own local news in English. Live 89.5 Radio is owned by Class Act Media Co. Ltd, which also publishes The Phuket News.

The station plays a variety of genres of music and also has Talk Radio slots.

References

External links
Live 89.5 Radio's website
Live 89.5 Radio's webcast

Radio stations in Thailand
Phuket province
Mass media in Phuket (city)